Jens Birkholm (21 November 1869 – 11 May 1915) was a Danish genre painter associated with the group known as the Funen Painters.

Biography 
Birkholm was born in and died in Faaborg. His father was a Sailing Master. Several of his friends were aspiring artists, including Johannes Larsen and Peter Hansen. Although his only formal training was an apprenticeship with an obscure local artist, he drew and painted together with them in his spare time and absorbed the influence of Kristian Zahrtmann, who was their teacher in Copenhagen.

He was a pacifist so, to avoid military service, he worked as a travelling companion for visitors to Switzerland and Germany, where he also found work as a painter. While in Germany, he came in contact with the Social Democrats and, in 1892, settled in Berlin, where he created paintings of poor people in times of distress, some of them done in homeless shelters. Later, these would come to be considered his most important works.

Under the influence of the Funen Painters, his style changed from social realism to impressionism and he shifted to painting mainly landscapes. He maintained an interest in social issues, however, and was often at odds with Faaborg's conservative government.

In 1906 he returned to Berlin, where he revisited the shelters, asylums, and orphanages and created paintings with new characters in his new style. From 1904 to 1912, he held annual exhibitions in Faaborg and made several trips abroad, including Italy (1905) and Tunisia (1911).

He became seriously ill in 1914 and spent almost a year in a sanatorium. The following year, he succumbed to his illness at the age of forty-six.

References

Further reading
 Susanne Thestrup Truelsen, Jens Birkholm - landskaber, Faaborg Museum, 2000

External links 

ArtNet: More works by Birkholm.
"Jens Birkholm - en socialistisk maler"  from the Dagbladet Arbejderen, a Communist Party (Denmark) publication. (2007)

1869 births
1915 deaths
19th-century Danish painters
20th-century Danish painters
20th-century deaths from tuberculosis
Danish male painters
Danish genre painters
Social realist artists
Danish landscape painters
People from Faaborg-Midtfyn Municipality
Tuberculosis deaths in Denmark
Danish pacifists
19th-century Danish male artists
20th-century Danish male artists